The 2003 Ottawa Renegades season was the second season for the team in the Canadian Football League and 2nd overall. The Renegades finished the season with an improved 7–11 record, but still failed to make the playoffs.

Offseason

CFL Draft

Preseason

Regular season

Season Standings

Season schedule

References

Ottawa Renegades
2003
Ottawa Renegades